The Mihăileşti explosion occurred on 24 May 2004 in the village of Mihăileşti, Buzău County, Romania. A truck loaded with ammonium nitrate rolled over and caught fire before exploding an hour later killing at least 18 people and injuring 13 others.

At 4:57 AM local time, a truck loaded with 20 tons of ammonium nitrate rolled over on the express road E85 connecting Bucharest with Moldavia. Soon after the accident, the truck caught fire, so the driver immediately called the emergency number. Two fire trucks arrived at the scene 20 minutes later and started putting out the fire. A TV crew also arrived and started filming for a news program.  Meanwhile, curious villagers gathered around the accident site.

At 5:47 AM, a small explosion took place in the cabin of the truck, followed two minutes later by a larger explosion, killing seven firefighters, the TV crew (Ionuţ Barbu and Elena Popescu from Antena 1), several villagers and the truck driver, totalling 18 people; 13 others were injured.

Of the 18 killed, two people (the truck driver and one of the firefighters) had to be identified by means of DNA testing. The explosion left behind a 6.5 meter deep crater, scattered human remains and debris over a several hundred meters radius, and caused damage amounting to about 70,000 euros.

Following this event, safety regulations for the transport of chemical substances were improved and ammonium nitrate was classified as a hazardous chemical compound. Ion Gherghe, the director of the Doljchim plant which produced the ammonium nitrate, and the managers of the two companies involved in the transport of this substance without safety measures, Mihai Gună and Ionel Ionuț Neagoe were charged with homicide by negligence and destruction of property.  All were found guilty and sentenced to four years in jail, as well as the payment of compensations to the victims' families.

See also
 2004 in Romania
 2012 Sighetu Marmației explosions
 List of 21st-century explosions
 List of ammonium nitrate disasters
 Zalău explosion

References

2004 disasters in Romania
2004 in Romania
2004 road incidents
Buzău County
Explosions in Romania
Explosions in 2004
Transport disasters in Romania
May 2004 events in Europe
Ammonium nitrate disasters
Tanker explosions